Sponberg is a surname. Notable people with the surname include:

Frank Sponberg (1913–2000), Australian rugby league footballer 
Nicol Sponberg (born 1970), American Christian singer
Oddvar Sponberg (1914–1975), Norwegian race walker
Svanhild Sponberg, Norwegian handball player